Sudan competed at the 2010 Summer Youth Olympics, the inaugural Youth Olympic Games, held in Singapore from 14 August to 26 August 2010.

Athletics

Boys
Track and Road Events

Girls
Track and Road Events

Rowing

References

External links
Competitors List: Sudan – Singapore 2010 official site

Youth
Nations at the 2010 Summer Youth Olympics
Sudan at the Youth Olympics